ViaQuatro is a company belonging to Companhia de Concessões Rodoviárias, being responsible for the operation, maintenance and investiments of more than US$2 billion in the Line 4 of São Paulo Metro for 30 years, through the first public-private concession contract of the country, in partnership with the Government of the State of São Paulo.

In the public-private concession contract signed, it is up to São Paulo Metro to install the civil infrastructure of the Line (stations construction, substations, rail yard and maintenance, tunnels, etc.), being the dealership responsible for the operation and maintenance of the line and acquisition of the rolling material, signaling systems, telecommunications and CCO (Operational Control Center).

ViaQuatro fleet
Line 4-Yellow has a fleet of 174 vehicles:

See also
 Line 4 (São Paulo Metro)

References

External links
ViaQuatro official website

Rapid transit in Brazil
Electric railways in Brazil
Underground rapid transit in Brazil
ViaQuatro